Spantekow is a municipality in the Vorpommern-Greifswald district, in Mecklenburg-Vorpommern, Germany. It comprises the villages Dennin, Drewelow, Fasanenhof, Janow, Japenzin, Neuendorf B, Rehberg, Rebelow and Spantekow.

Since the Middle Ages, Spantekow is a local administrative center and the site of a fortress. Though Spantekow castle was largely destroyed in a Brandenburgian attack in 1677, it remained a residence of the local nobility until 1945. Today, the village is seat of the Amt Anklam-Land.

References

Vorpommern-Greifswald